Gandoman Rural District is in Gandoman District of Borujen County, Chaharmahal and Bakhtiari province, Iran. At the census of 2006, its population was 5,128 in 1,238 households; there were 4,855 inhabitants in 1,359 households at the following census of 2011; and in the most recent census of 2016, the population of the rural district was 4,622 in 1,393 households. The largest of its 13 villages was Konarak-e Bala, with 1,058 people.

References 

Borujen County

Rural Districts of Chaharmahal and Bakhtiari Province

Populated places in Chaharmahal and Bakhtiari Province

Populated places in Borujen County